Johannes Jank (born 21 July 1936) is an Austrian footballer. He played in one match for the Austria national football team in 1963.

References

External links
 

1936 births
Living people
Austrian footballers
Austria international footballers
Place of birth missing (living people)
Association footballers not categorized by position